Gilbert C. Smith was a state legislator in Mississippi.

Smith was born in South Carolina. He represented Tunica County in the Mississippi House of Representatives from 1872 to 1875 and 1884 to 1885.

In 1896 the Meridian newspaper in a write up about the Reconstruction era stated he argued for state legislators to be made lawyers and attributed a quote to him.

See also
 African-American officeholders during and following the Reconstruction era

References

African-American state legislators in Mississippi
Members of the Mississippi House of Representatives
People from Tunica County, Mississippi
People from South Carolina
African-American politicians during the Reconstruction Era